The Temple Church is a 12th-century church in London, England, built by the Knights Templar.

Temple Church may also refer to:
Temple Church, Bristol, a ruined church in Bristol, England, built by the Knights Templar
Temple Church, Cambridge, England
Temple Church, Cornwall, the parish church of the village of Temple, Cornwall, also built by the Knights Templar